This is a list of organizations dealing with the various geosciences, including geology, geophysics, hydrology, oceanography, petrophysics, and related fields.

 
 
 
 
  
  
  
  

Asia Oceania Geosciences Society (AOGS)
  
   
 (Canadian Association of Mining Equipment and Services for Export)

  

  
 
 

 

  
 
 

 

 (Scotland)

 
 
 

 

  
  
  
 

 
 
 
  
 

 
 

  
  
  
 
 (Italy)
 
 
  
  

 
  
  
 
 
 

 
  
 
  
 
 
 
 
 
 
 
  
 
 
 
 
Geological Society of Malaysia

References

.
.
Earth sciences
Geology
Science-related lists
Lists of professional associations